"Ten Ton Brick" is a song by American rock band Hurt. The song was released as the lead single from the band's fourth studio album Vol. II. "Ten Ton Brick" is arguably Hurt's most well known song, peaking at no. 6 on the Billboard Mainstream Rock chart.

Music video
The song's music video was directed by Anthony Honn.

Reception
On May 12, 2009, Hurt received an award for the song during SESAC’s 13th annual New York Music Awards.

Track listing

Chart positions

References

Hurt (band) songs
2007 songs
2007 singles
Capitol Records singles